Laurence Harvey was a Lithuanian-born South African-bred English actor  

Laurence, Lawrence or Larry Harvey may also refer to:

Sports
Laurence Harvey (cycling), participated in cycling at the 2013 Canada Summer Games
Lawrence Harvey (rugby union) (c.1876 - c.1953), Scotland player
Lawrence Harvey (footballer) (born 1972), Turks and Caicos footballer

Others
Laurence R. Harvey, English actor (born 1970)
Larry Harvey, artist and  Burning Man Festival co-founder
Larry Harvey (American Horror Story), character
Larry Harvey (musician) in Academy of Canadian Cinema and Television Award for Best Achievement in Music – Original Song